The Nanedi Valles are a set of channels in a large valley in the Lunae Palus quadrangle of Mars, located at 
4.9° N and 49.0° W.  They are 508 km long and were named for the word for "planet" in Sesotho, the national language of Lesotho, Africa.

The Nanedi Valles are located between Shalbatana Vallis and the upper Maja Valles. They are 4 km wide at their northern end. Their valley's shape is similar to that of Nirgal Vallis, being very sinuous and having only a few short branches.

Unusually for Martian valleys, the individual channel structures within the wider valley floors can occasionally be seen in this system.

Gallery

References

External links

Lunae Palus quadrangle
Valleys and canyons on Mars